Neş'ecan Göktürk (born 1 April 1947), better known as Neşe Karaböcek, is a Turkish singer and considered one of the main artists of Turkish Arabesque music, a fusion of traditional Turkish and world music influences and adaptations of international sounds. She also starred in a great number of Turkish films. She was popular from her first release for the single "Artık Sevmeyeceğim" until the mid 1990s with multiple gold and platinum certifications.

Personal life
She started singing at a very young age. Her marriage to musician Atilla Alpsakarya, owner and president of Elenor Plak, produced a son named Alper before they got divorced in 1974. She later married journalist Tevfik Yener with whom she had a second son Hasan.
She is the sister of Gülden Karaböcek, another turkish singer.

Discography
Major labels that released her albums include Pathe Plak (1961–1965), Alp Plak (1969–1970), As Plak (1971–1973), Kervan Plak (1974–1976).

1968: Neşe Karaböcek
1969: Uğur Böceği
1971: Sensiz Kalan Gönlümde
1971: Neşe Karaböcek 1971
1972: Büyük Aşkların Kaderi
1972: Geri Dönülmez Bir Yoldayım
1973: Neşe Karaböcek 1973
1974: Neşe Karaböcek 1974
1974: Neşe Karaböcek 1974 (Elenor LP)
1974: Niyet
1974: Ümidini Kirpiklerine
1975: Deli Gibi Sevdim
1976: Dünden Bugüne
1977: Minareci 2 Özel Seri (with Biricik)
1978: Uğur Böceği
1979: Dost Bahçesi
1979: Uzelli 618 (with Ahmet Özhan) 
1980: Beddua
1980: Şu Karşıki Evde Bir Çocuk Doğmuş
1981: Canım Dinleyicilerim
1982: Yedi Renk
1983: Yağmur Altında
1984: Kertenkele
1985: Avare
1985: Telli Telli
1986: Arkadaş
1986: Çiçek Dağı
1986: Dünden Beri
1988: Bir Öptüm & Yağmur"
1988: Süper Arabesk1989: Deliler Gibi - İşte Eyle1989: Dertli1990: Yağmur Ağlıyor1991: Arkadaş (USA)
1991: Ateş Benim Kül Benim1991: Uğur Böceği1992: Altın Şarkılar1992: Yam Yam1993: Bir Hüzzam Şarkı Gibi1993: Altın Şarkılar 21994: Hatırla1995: Cucu - Öp Gizlice1996: Bir Tanem1998: Maşaallah1998-2000: Allah Kerim / Arabesk Kralicesi / Arşiv Serisi - 6 / As Plak LP 1002 / Gönül Dağı / Klasikler LP / Minareci 10 / 7 (on Türküola)
2000: Ölmeyen Şarkılar
2001: Öldüğümü Unuturum
2002: Sabır Allah Sabır'
2007: Avare2009: Deli Gibi Sevdim (rerelease)
2009: Şu Karşıki Evde Bir Çocuk Doğmuş (rerelease)

Filmography
1971: Anneler ve Kızları1972: Aşk Sepeti1972: Ah Koca Dünya1973: Sevda Yolu1973: Niyet1973: İntizar1974: Kısmet1974: Almanya'da Bir Türk Kızı1975: Duyun Beni1976: Kuklalar1986: KertenkeleTV 
2008: Düğün Şarkıcısı'' (Canal D, reality television programme, guest star)

References

External links

Turkish women singers
1947 births
Living people
Singers from Istanbul